USS R-23 (SS-99) was an R-class coastal and harbor defense submarine built for the United States Navy during World War I.

Description
The R-boats built by Lake Torpedo Boat Company (R-21 through R-27) are sometimes considered a separate class from those of the other builders. They displaced  on the surface and  submerged. The R-class submarines had a crew of 3 officers and 23 enlisted men.

For surface running, the boats were powered by two  diesel engines, each driving one propeller shaft. When submerged each propeller was driven by a  electric motor. They could reach  on the surface and  underwater.

The boats were armed with four 21-inch (53.3 cm) torpedo tubes in the bow. They carried four reloads, for a total of eight torpedoes. The R-class submarines were also armed with a single 3"/50 caliber deck gun.

Construction and career
R-23 was laid down on 19 April 1917 by the Lake Torpedo Boat Company in Bridgeport, Connecticut. She was launched on 23 September 1918 sponsored by Mrs. Erie A. Eklund, and commissioned on 1 August 1919. Following commissioning, R-22 operated in the New London, Connecticut-Newport, Rhode Island area for two months. On 1 November, she headed south for Coco Solo in the Panama Canal Zone, her homeport. Given hull classification symbol SS-99 in July 1920, she was based in the Canal Zone with Submarine Division 1 through that year. The following year she was transferred back to New London for duty with Submarine Division 0, an experimental division. She was based at New London for the rest of her active service returning to Panama only for the 1923 Fleet Problem. In the summer of 1922, a conversion was performed on her bow at Portsmouth Naval Shipyard to address concerns regarding reserve buoyancy. Ordered inactivated in 1924, she was towed to Philadelphia, Pennsylvania, in November and decommissioned there 29 April 1925. Five years later 9 May 1930, she was struck from the Naval Vessel Register. She was sold for scrapping in July of the same year.

Notes

References

External links
 

Ships built in Bridgeport, Connecticut
United States R-class submarines
1918 ships